St. Marinos is a ruined Armenian Orthodox monastery in the Gürpınar district of Van Province of Turkey, to the southeast of Lake Van.

History
The monastery is situated on a slope of a mountain overlooking the wide and fertile lower section of the valley of the Hoşap, now known as the Gürpınar plain and formerly called Hayots Dzor meaning: Valley of the Armenians. The date of the foundation of the St. Marinos monastery is not known, and the crudity of its construction makes its buildings difficult to date. It originally had the alternative name of Srkhouvank. It was founded to house a community of nuns and was dedicated to the female saints Marinos and Theodora. It had an active scriptorium during the second half of the 16th century: in Yerevan's Matenadaran museum there exist five manuscripts that are known to have originated in the convent.

Notes

Armenian churches in Turkey
Christian monasteries established in the 10th century
Destroyed churches
History of Van Province
Buildings and structures in Van Province
Armenian buildings in Turkey